Blood worm or bloodworm is an ambiguous term and can refer to:

 Larvae of a non-biting midge (family Chironomidae) containing hemoglobin
 Glycera (annelid), a polychaete often used for fishing bait
 Species of the Polychaeta subclass  Scolecida
 Angiostrongylus cantonensis, a parasitic nematode that causes Angiostrongyliasis and the most common cause of eosinophilic meningitis
 Eisenia fetida, an earthworm adapted to decaying organic material
 Lumbriculus variegatus, more commonly called blackworm
 Strongylus vulgaris, a common horse parasite

Animal common name disambiguation pages